Kaninuwa, or Wataluma, is a major Oceanic language of Goodenough Island, Papua New Guinea.

Alphabet 
Kaninuwa has 23 letters (A/a, B/b, Bw/bw, D/d, E/e, F/f, Fw/fw, G/g, Gw/gw, Ḡ/ḡ, I/i, K/k, Kw/kw, M/m, Mw/mw, N/n, O/o, S/s, T/t, U/u, V/v, W/w, Y/y).

References

External links 
 Alphabet and pronunciation

Nuclear Papuan Tip languages
Languages of Milne Bay Province